Branko Mihajlović (born 20 February 1991) is a Serbian football forward who plays for Enosis Neon Paralimni in the Cypriot First Division.

Club career

Partizan
Mihajlović made his debut for the first team of Partizan in the last round of 2008–09 season against Čukarički. In the next season he was sent to Partizan's affiliated team Teleoptik.

Rad
He signed with Rad at the beginning of 2010–11 season. He never made his debut for the team. As a player of Rad, he was on loan to Lovćen at the half of the season.

Čukarički
In the summer 2011 Mihajlović transferred to Čukarički. In the 2011–12 season, he scored a goal in an away match against Sloga Kraljevo, on Kraljevo City Stadium, when Čukarički made a very important win and that was one step to stay in league. He scored 2 goals in 16 matches during that season.

During that season, he played on 22 league matches and scored 2 goals. He also played in two cup matches.

Sinđelić Beograd
After the promotion of Čukarički to Jelen SuperLiga, he has been loaned to Sinđelić Beograd. In the first half of 2013–14 season, he was one of the best players in Sinđelić. In the first four fixtures of the second part of season, team made one loss, and then three wins, versus leading teams in league, Mladost Lučani, Borac Čačak, and Sloga Kraljevo. Mihajlović scored goals in all of those three matches, which promoted him to the league's top scorer at that moment, with 10 goals. He ended the season with 14 scored goals, second in the league.

Hapoel Kfar Saba
Branko Mihajlović signed one year contract with Hapoel Kfar Saba in the summer 2014. He played 37 games in Liga Leumit and scored 8 goals. He also played three matches in Israel Cup. At the end of the season the club finished in the second place in the league, and secured a promotion to Israeli Premier League. Mihajlović was one of the best players in the club during that season.

Hapoel Petah Tikva
In the summer 2015, he was signed by Hapoel Petah Tikva. During that season, the club ended on 6th place in Liga Leumit and Mihajlović scored 13 goals for the club in 33 league matches.

Hapoel Acre
Mihajlović signed for Hapoel Acre in the summer 2016.
During this season, he played 35 games in Liga Leumit and scored  15 goals. At the end of the season, the club finished in the second place in the league, and secured a promotion to Israeli Premier League. Mihajlović was one of the best players in the club during that season.

Hapoel Petah Tikva
Mihajlović signed for Hapoel Petah Tikva one year contract for 2017–18 season. He played 37 league matches and scored 10 goals. He also played one match in Israel State Cup. He left the club at the end of the season on free transfer.

Diósgyőri VTK
In August 2018, Mihajlović completed a move to Diósgyőri. He played 27 matches for the time in this season, and scored 4 goals in total. In February 2020 he was released from club.

Mačva
After being released from Diósgyőri VTK, he joined FK Mačva Šabac on a free transfer on February 8, 2020.

Alashkert
In February 2021, after being without a club for a few months, Mihajlović signed for Alashkert, and during his spell there he won 2020–21 Armenian Premier League and 2021 Armenian Supercup. He also played in 2021–22 UEFA Europa Conference League group stage.

Zvijezda 09
Mihajlović joined Zvijezda 09 in March 2022. He played 3 matches and scored 1 goal in the First League of Republic of Srpska. At the end of the season he left the club.

Enosis Neon Paralimni
In the end of June 2022, Mihajlović signed for Enosis Neon Paralimni.

Career statistics

Club

Honours

Club
Alashkert
 Armenian Premier League: 2020–21
 Armenian Supercup: 2021

References

External links
 Stats at utakmica.rs

1991 births
Living people
Footballers from Belgrade
Association football forwards
Serbian footballers
FK Partizan players
FK Teleoptik players
FK Rad players
FK Lovćen players
FK Čukarički players
FK Sinđelić Beograd players
Hapoel Kfar Saba F.C. players
Hapoel Petah Tikva F.C. players
Hapoel Acre F.C. players
Diósgyőri VTK players
FK Mačva Šabac players
FC Alashkert players
Serbian SuperLiga players
Liga Leumit players
Nemzeti Bajnokság I players
Armenian Premier League players
Serbian expatriate sportspeople in Montenegro
Serbian expatriate sportspeople in Israel
Serbian expatriate sportspeople in Hungary
Serbian expatriate sportspeople in Armenia
Expatriate footballers in Montenegro
Expatriate footballers in Israel
Expatriate footballers in Hungary
Expatriate footballers in Armenia